Jehovah's Witnesses is a millenarian restorationist Christian denomination with nontrinitarian beliefs distinct from mainstream Christianity. The group reports a worldwide membership of approximately 8.5 million adherents involved in evangelism and an annual Memorial attendance of over 19.7 million. Jehovah's Witnesses are directed by the Governing Body of Jehovah's Witnesses, a group of elders in Warwick, New York, United States, which establishes all doctrines based on its interpretations of the Bible. They believe that the destruction of the present world system at Armageddon is imminent, and that the establishment of God's kingdom over the earth is the only solution for all problems faced by humanity.

The group emerged from the Bible Student movement founded in the late 1870s by Charles Taze Russell, who also co-founded Zion's Watch Tower Tract Society in 1881 to organize and print the movement's publications. A leadership dispute after Russell's death resulted in several groups breaking away, with Joseph Franklin Rutherford retaining control of the Watch Tower Society and its properties. Rutherford made significant organizational and doctrinal changes, including adoption of the name Jehovah's witnesses in 1931 to distinguish them from other Bible Student groups and symbolize a break with the legacy of Russell's traditions.

Jehovah's Witnesses are known for their door-to-door preaching, distributing literature such as The Watchtower and Awake!, and for refusing military service and blood transfusions. They consider the use of God's name vital for proper worship. They reject Trinitarianism, inherent immortality of the soul, and hellfire, which they consider to be unscriptural doctrines. They do not observe Christmas, Easter, birthdays or other holidays and customs they consider to have pagan origins incompatible with Christianity. They prefer to use their own Bible translation, the New World Translation of the Holy Scriptures, although their literature occasionally quotes and cites other Bible translations. Adherents commonly refer to their body of beliefs as "The Truth" and consider themselves to be "in the Truth". They consider "human society" to be morally corrupt and under the influence of Satan, and most limit their social interaction with non-Witnesses. Congregational disciplinary actions include disfellowshipping, their term for formal expulsion and shunning, a last resort for what they consider serious offenses. Baptized individuals who formally leave are considered disassociated and are also shunned. Disfellowshipped and disassociated individuals may eventually be reinstated if deemed repentant.

The group's position regarding conscientious objection to military service and refusal to salute state symbols (like national anthems and flags) has brought it into conflict with some governments. Consequently, some Jehovah's Witnesses have been persecuted and their activities are banned or restricted in some countries. Persistent legal challenges by Jehovah's Witnesses have influenced legislation related to civil rights in several countries.

The organization has received criticism regarding biblical translation, doctrines, and alleged coercion of its members. The Watch Tower Society has made various unfulfilled predictions about major biblical events such as Christ's Second Coming, the advent of God's kingdom, and Armageddon. Their policies for handling cases of child sexual abuse have been the subject of various formal inquiries.

History

Background (1870–1916)

In 1870, Charles Taze Russell and others formed a group in Pittsburgh, Pennsylvania, to study the Bible. During the course of his ministry, Russell disputed many beliefs of mainstream Christianity including immortality of the soul, hellfire, predestination, the fleshly return of Jesus Christ, the Trinity, and the burning up of the world. In 1876, Russell met Nelson H. Barbour. Later that year they jointly produced the book Three Worlds, which combined restitutionist views with end time prophecy.

The book taught that God's dealings with humanity were divided dispensationally, each ending with a "harvest," that Christ had returned as an invisible spirit being in 1874 inaugurating the "harvest of the Gospel age", and that 1914 would mark the end of a 2,520-year period called "the Gentile Times", at which time world society would be replaced by the full establishment of God's kingdom on earth. Beginning in 1878, Russell and Barbour jointly edited a religious journal, Herald of the Morning. In June 1879, the two split over doctrinal differences, and in July, Russell began publishing the magazine Zion's Watch Tower and Herald of Christ's Presence, stating that its purpose was to demonstrate that the world was in "the last days," and that a new age of earthly and human restitution under the reign of Christ was imminent.

From 1879, Watch Tower supporters gathered as autonomous congregations to study the Bible topically. Thirty congregations were founded, and during 1879 and 1880, Russell visited each to provide the format he recommended for conducting meetings. In 1881, Zion's Watch Tower Tract Society was presided over by William Henry Conley, and in 1884, Russell incorporated the society as a non-profit business to distribute tracts and Bibles. By about 1900, Russell had organized thousands of part- and full-time colporteurs, and was appointing foreign missionaries and establishing branch offices. By the 1910s, Russell's organization maintained nearly a hundred "pilgrims," or traveling preachers. Russell engaged in significant global publishing efforts during his ministry, and by 1912, he was the most distributed Christian author in the United States.

Russell moved the Watch Tower Society's headquarters to Brooklyn, New York, in 1909, combining printing and corporate offices with a house of worship; volunteers were housed in a nearby residence he named Bethel. He identified the religious movement as "Bible Students," and more formally as the International Bible Students Association. By 1910, about 50,000 people worldwide were associated with the movement and congregations re-elected him annually as their pastor. Russell died October 31, 1916, at the age of 64 while returning from a ministerial speaking tour.

Reorganization (1917–1942)

In January 1917, the Watch Tower Society's legal representative, Joseph Franklin Rutherford, was elected as its next president. His election was disputed, and members of the Board of Directors accused him of acting in an autocratic and secretive manner. The divisions between his supporters and opponents triggered a major turnover of members over the next decade. In June 1917, he released The Finished Mystery as a seventh volume of Russell's Studies in the Scriptures series. The book, published as the posthumous work of Russell, was a compilation of his commentaries on the Bible books of Ezekiel and Revelation, plus numerous additions by Bible Students Clayton Woodworth and George Fisher. It strongly criticized Catholic and Protestant clergy and Christian involvement in the Great War. As a result, Watch Tower Society directors were jailed for sedition under the Espionage Act in 1918 and members were subjected to mob violence; the directors were released in March 1919 and charges against them were dropped in 1920.

Rutherford centralized organizational control of the Watch Tower Society. In 1919, he instituted the appointment of a director in each congregation, and a year later all members were instructed to report their weekly preaching activity to the Brooklyn headquarters. At an international convention held at Cedar Point, Ohio, in September 1922, a new emphasis was made on house-to-house preaching. Significant changes in doctrine and administration were regularly introduced during Rutherford's twenty-five years as president, including the 1920 announcement that the Hebrew patriarchs (such as Abraham and Isaac) would be resurrected in 1925, marking the beginning of Christ's thousand-year earthly kingdom. 

Because of disappointment over the changes and unfulfilled predictions, tens of thousands of defections occurred during the first half of Rutherford's tenure, leading to the formation of several Bible Student organizations independent of the Watch Tower Society, most of which still exist. By mid-1919, as many as one in seven of Russell-era Bible Students had ceased their association with the Society, and as many as three-quarters by the end of the 1920s.

On July 26, 1931, at a convention in Columbus, Ohio, Rutherford introduced the new name – Jehovah's witnesses – based on Isaiah 43:10: "'Ye are my witnesses, saith the Lord, and my servant whom I have chosen: that ye may know and believe me, and understand that I am he: before me there was no God formed, neither shall there be after me.'" (King James Version, KJV) —which was adopted by resolution. The name was chosen to distinguish his group of Bible Students from other independent groups that had severed ties with the Society, as well as symbolize the instigation of new outlooks and the promotion of fresh evangelizing methods. In 1932, Rutherford eliminated the system of locally elected elders and in 1938, introduced what he called a "theocratic" (literally, God-ruled) organizational system, under which appointments in congregations worldwide were made from the Brooklyn headquarters.

From 1932, it was taught that the "little flock" of 144,000 would not be the only people to survive Armageddon. Rutherford explained that in addition to the 144,000 "anointed" who would be resurrected—or transferred at death—to live in heaven to rule over earth with Christ, a separate class of members, the "great multitude," would live in a paradise restored on earth; from 1935, new converts to the movement were considered part of that class. By the mid-1930s, the timing of the beginning of Christ's presence (Greek: parousía), his enthronement as king, and the start of the "last days" were each moved to 1914.

As their interpretations of the Bible evolved, Witness publications decreed that saluting national flags is a form of idolatry, which led to a new outbreak of mob violence and government opposition in the United States, Canada, Germany, and other countries.

Worldwide membership of Jehovah's Witnesses reached 113,624 in 5,323 congregations by the time of Rutherford's death in January 1942.

Continued development (1942–present)

Nathan Knorr was appointed as third president of the Watch Tower Bible and Tract Society in 1942. Knorr commissioned a new translation of the Bible, the New World Translation of the Holy Scriptures, the full version of which was released in 1961. He organized large international assemblies, instituted new training programs for members, and expanded missionary activity and branch offices throughout the world. Knorr's presidency was also marked by an increasing use of explicit instructions guiding Witnesses in their lifestyle and conduct, and a greater use of congregational judicial procedures to enforce a strict moral code.

From 1966, Witness publications and convention talks built anticipation of the possibility that Christ's thousand-year reign might begin in late 1975 or shortly thereafter. The number of baptisms increased significantly, from about 59,000 in 1966 to more than 297,000 in 1974. By 1975, the number of active members exceeded two million. Membership declined during the late 1970s after expectations for 1975 were proved wrong. Watch Tower Society literature did not state dogmatically that 1975 would definitely mark the end, but in 1980 the Watch Tower Society admitted its responsibility in building up hope regarding that year.

The offices of elder and ministerial servant were restored to Witness congregations in 1972, with appointments made from headquarters (and later, also by branch committees). It was announced that, starting in September 2014, appointments would be made by traveling overseers. In a major organizational overhaul in 1976, the power of the Watch Tower Society president was diminished, with authority for doctrinal and organizational decisions passed to the Governing Body. Since Knorr's death in 1977, the position of president has been occupied by Frederick Franz (1977–1992) and Milton Henschel (1992–2000), both members of the Governing Body, and since 2000 by others who are not Governing Body members. In 1995, Jehovah's Witnesses abandoned the idea that Armageddon must occur during the lives of the generation that was alive in 1914 and in 2010 changed their teaching on the "generation".

Organization

Jehovah's Witnesses are organized hierarchically, in what the leadership calls a "theocratic organization", reflecting their belief that it is God's "visible organization" on earth. The organization is led by the Governing Body—an all-male group that varies in size. Since January 2018, it has comprised eight members, all of whom profess to be of the "anointed" class with a hope of heavenly life—based in the Watch Tower Society's Warwick headquarters. There is no election for membership; new members are selected by the existing body. Until late 2012, the Governing Body described itself as the representative and "spokesman" for God's "faithful and discreet slave class" (then approximately 10,000 self-professed "anointed" Jehovah's Witnesses). 

At the 2012 Annual Meeting of the Watch Tower Society, the "faithful and discreet slave" was defined as referring to the Governing Body only. The Governing Body directs several committees that are responsible for administrative functions, including publishing, assembly programs and evangelizing activities. It appoints all branch committee members and traveling overseers, after they have been recommended by local branches, with traveling overseers supervising circuits of congregations within their jurisdictions. Traveling overseers appoint local elders and ministerial servants, while branch offices may appoint regional committees for matters such as Kingdom Hall construction or disaster relief. The leadership and supporting staff lives in properties owned by the organization worldwide referred to as "Bethel" where they operate as a religious community and administrative unit. Their living expenses and those of other full-time volunteers are covered by the organization along with a basic monthly stipend.

Each congregation has a body of appointed unpaid male elders and ministerial servants. Elders maintain general responsibility for congregational governance, setting meeting times, selecting speakers and conducting meetings, directing the public preaching work, and creating "judicial committees" to investigate and decide disciplinary action for cases involving sexual misconduct or doctrinal breaches. New elders are appointed by a traveling overseer after recommendation by the existing body of elders. Ministerial servants—appointed in a similar manner to elders—fulfill clerical and attendant duties, but may also teach and conduct meetings. Witnesses do not use elder as a title to signify a formal clergy-laity division, though elders may employ ecclesiastical privilege regarding confession of sins.

Baptism is a requirement for being considered a member of Jehovah's Witnesses. Jehovah's Witnesses do not practice infant baptism, and previous baptisms performed by other denominations are not considered valid. Individuals undergoing baptism must affirm publicly that dedication and baptism identify them "as one of Jehovah's Witnesses in association with God's spirit-directed organization," though Witness publications say baptism symbolizes personal dedication to God and not "to a man, work or organization." Their literature emphasizes the need for members to be obedient and loyal to Jehovah and to "his organization," stating that individuals must remain part of it to receive God's favor and to survive Armageddon.

Publishing
The organization produces a significant amount of literature as part of its evangelism activities. The Watch Tower Society has produced over 227 million copies of the New World Translation in whole or in part in over 185 languages. In 2010, The Watchtower and Awake! were the most widely distributed magazines in the world. Translation of Witness publications is done by over 2,000 volunteers worldwide, producing literature in 1,000 languages. Publications are also available online at the organization's official website.

Funding
Much of their funding is provided by donations, primarily from members. There is no tithing or collection. In 2001 Newsday listed the Watch Tower Society as one of New York's forty richest corporations, with revenues exceeding $950 million. The organization reported for the same year that it "spent over $70.9 million in caring for special pioneers, missionaries, and traveling overseers in their field service assignments."

Beliefs

Sources of doctrine
Jehovah's Witnesses believe their denomination is a restoration of first-century Christianity. Doctrines of Jehovah's Witnesses are established by the Governing Body, which assumes responsibility for interpreting and applying scripture. The Governing Body does not issue any single, comprehensive "statement of faith", but prefers to express its doctrinal position in a variety of ways through publications published by the Watch Tower Society. Their publications teach that doctrinal changes and refinements result from a process of progressive revelation, in which God gradually reveals his will and purpose, and that such enlightenment or "new light" results from the application of reason and study, the guidance of the holy spirit, and direction from Jesus Christ and angels. The Society also teaches that members of the Governing Body are helped by the holy spirit to discern "deep truths", which are then considered by the entire Governing Body before it makes doctrinal decisions. The group's leadership, while disclaiming divine inspiration and infallibility, is said to provide "divine guidance" through its teachings described as "based on God's Word thus ... not from men, but from Jehovah."

The entire Protestant canon of scripture is considered the inspired, inerrant word of God. Jehovah's Witnesses consider the Bible to be scientifically and historically accurate and reliable and interpret much of it literally, but accept parts of it as symbolic. They consider the Bible to be the final authority for all their beliefs. Sociologist Andrew Holden's ethnographic study of the group concluded that pronouncements of the Governing Body, through Watch Tower Society publications, carry almost as much weight as the Bible. 

Regular personal Bible reading is frequently recommended. Witnesses are discouraged from formulating doctrines and "private ideas" reached through Bible research independent of Watch Tower Society publications, and are cautioned against reading other religious literature. Adherents are told to have "complete confidence" in the leadership, to avoid skepticism about what is taught in the Watch Tower Society's literature, and to "not advocate or insist on personal opinions or harbor private ideas when it comes to Bible understanding." The organization makes no provision for members to criticize or contribute to official teachings. All Witnesses must abide by its doctrines and organizational requirements.

Jehovah

Jehovah's Witnesses emphasize the use of God's name, and they prefer the form Jehovah—a vocalization of God's name based on the Tetragrammaton. They believe that Jehovah is the only true God, the creator of all things, and the "Universal Sovereign". They believe that all worship should be directed toward him, and that he is not part of a Trinity; consequently, the group places more emphasis on God than on Christ. They believe that the Holy Spirit is God's applied power or "active force", rather than a person.

Jesus
Jehovah's Witnesses believe that Jesus is God's only direct creation, that everything else was created through Christ by means of God's power, and that the initial unassisted act of creation uniquely identifies Jesus as God's "only-begotten Son". Jesus served as a redeemer and a ransom sacrifice to pay for the sins of humanity. They believe Jesus died on a single upright post rather than the traditional cross. Jehovah's Witnesses believe that Jesus was resurrected with a "spirit body", and that he only assumed human form for a temporary period after his resurrection.

Biblical references to the Archangel Michael, Abaddon (Apollyon), and the Word are interpreted as names for Jesus in various roles. Jesus is considered to be the only intercessor and high priest between God and humanity, and appointed by God as the king and judge of his kingdom. His role as a mediator (referred to in 1 Timothy 2:5) is applied to the 'anointed' class, though the 'other sheep' are said to also benefit from the arrangement.

Satan
Jehovah's Witnesses believe that Satan was originally a perfect angel who developed feelings of self-importance and craved worship. Satan influenced Adam and Eve to disobey God, and humanity subsequently became participants in a challenge involving the competing claims of Jehovah and Satan to universal sovereignty. Other angels who sided with Satan became demons.

Jehovah's Witnesses teach that Satan and his demons were cast down to earth from heaven after October 1, 1914, at which point the end times began. They believe that Satan is the ruler of the current world order, that human society is influenced and misled by Satan and his demons, and that they are a cause of human suffering. They also believe that human governments are controlled by Satan, but that he does not directly control each human ruler.

Life after death

Jehovah's Witnesses believe death is a state of non-existence with no consciousness. There is no Hell of fiery torment; Hades and Sheol are understood to refer to the condition of death, termed the common grave. Jehovah's Witnesses consider the soul to be a life or a living body that can die. Jehovah's Witnesses believe that humanity is in a sinful state, from which release is only possible by means of Jesus' shed blood as a ransom, or atonement, for the sins of humankind.

Witnesses believe that a "little flock" of 144,000 selected humans go to heaven, but that the majority (the "other sheep") are to be resurrected by God to a cleansed earth after Armageddon. They interpret Revelation 14:1–5 to mean that the number of Christians going to heaven is limited to exactly 144,000, who will rule with Jesus as kings and priests over earth. They believe that baptism as a Jehovah's Witness is vital for salvation and that only they meet scriptural requirements for surviving Armageddon, but that God is the final judge. During Christ's millennial reign, most people who died prior to Armageddon will be resurrected with the prospect of living forever; they will be taught the proper way to worship God to prepare them for their final test at the end of the millennium.

God's kingdom
Jehovah's Witnesses believe that God's kingdom is a literal government in heaven, ruled by Jesus Christ and 144,000 "spirit-anointed" Christians drawn from the earth, which they associate with Jesus' reference to a "new covenant". The kingdom is viewed as the means by which God will accomplish his original purpose for the earth, transforming it into a paradise without sickness or death. It is said to have been the focal point of Jesus' ministry on earth. They believe the kingdom was established in heaven in 1914, and that Jehovah's Witnesses serve as representatives of the kingdom on earth.

Eschatology

A central teaching of Jehovah's Witnesses is that the current world era, or "system of things", entered the "last days" in 1914 and faces imminent destruction through intervention by God and Jesus Christ, leading to deliverance for those who worship God acceptably. They consider all other present-day religions to be false, identifying them with "Babylon the Great", or the "harlot", of Revelation 17, and believe that they will soon be destroyed by the United Nations, which they believe is represented in scripture by the scarlet-colored wild beast of Revelation chapter 17. This development will mark the beginning of the "great tribulation". 

Satan will subsequently use world governments to attack Jehovah's Witnesses, an action that will prompt God to begin the war of Armageddon, during which all forms of government and all people not counted as Christ's "sheep" will be destroyed. After Armageddon, God will extend his heavenly kingdom to include earth, which will be transformed into a paradise similar to the Garden of Eden. Most of those who had died before God's intervention will gradually be resurrected during the thousand year "judgment day".

This judgment will be based on their actions after resurrection rather than past deeds. At the end of the thousand years, Christ will hand all authority back to God. Then a final test will take place when Satan is released to mislead perfect mankind. Those who fail will be destroyed, along with Satan and his demons. The result will be a fully tested, glorified human race on earth.

Jehovah's Witnesses believe that Jesus Christ began to rule in heaven as king of God's kingdom in October 1914, and that Satan was subsequently ousted from heaven to the earth, resulting in "woe" to humanity. They believe that Jesus rules invisibly, from heaven, perceived only as a series of "signs". They base this belief on a rendering of the Greek word parousia—usually translated as "coming" when referring to Christ—as "presence". They believe Jesus' presence includes an unknown period beginning with his inauguration as king in heaven in 1914, and ending when he comes to bring a final judgment against humans on earth. They thus depart from the mainstream Christian belief that the "second coming" of Matthew 24 refers to a single moment of arrival on earth to judge humans.

Gender roles
Jehovah's Witnesses believe that women were designed by God to perform a complementary role. Women actively participate in the public preaching work and can serve at Bethel. Women may profess to be members of the 144,000. Only men are allowed to hold positions of authority. Congregational roles such as ministerial servants and elders are exclusively male positions. Women are not allowed to address the congregation directly. In rare circumstances, women can substitute in certain capacities if there are no eligible men. In these situations, women must wear a head covering if they are performing a teaching role.

Practices

Worship

Meetings for worship and study are held at Kingdom Halls, which are typically functional in character, and do not contain religious symbols. Witnesses are assigned to a congregation in whose "territory" they usually reside and attend weekly services they refer to as "meetings" as scheduled by congregation elders. The meetings are largely devoted to study of Watch Tower Society literature and the Bible. The format of the meetings is established by the group's headquarters, and the subject matter for most meetings is the same worldwide. 

Congregations meet for two sessions each week comprising four distinct meetings that total about three-and-a-half hours, typically gathering mid-week (two meetings) and on the weekend (two meetings). Prior to 2009, congregations met three times each week; these meetings were condensed, with the intention that members dedicate an evening for "family worship". Gatherings are opened and closed with hymns (which they call Kingdom songs) and brief prayers. 

Twice each year, Witnesses from a number of congregations that form a "circuit" gather for a one-day assembly. Larger groups of congregations meet once a year for a three-day "regional convention", usually at rented stadiums or auditoriums. Their most important and solemn event is the commemoration of the "Lord's Evening Meal", or "Memorial of Christ's Death" on the date of the Jewish Passover.

Evangelism

Jehovah's Witnesses are known for their efforts to spread their beliefs, most notably by visiting people from house to house, distributing literature published by the Watch Tower Society. The objective is to start a regular "Bible study" with any person who is not already a member, with the intention that the student be baptized as a member of the group; Witnesses are advised to consider discontinuing Bible studies with students who show no interest in becoming members. 

Witnesses are taught they are under a biblical command to engage in public preaching. They are instructed to devote as much time as possible to their ministry and are required to submit an individual monthly "Field Service Report". Baptized members who fail to report a month of preaching are termed "irregular" and may be counseled by elders; those who do not submit reports for six consecutive months are termed "inactive".

Ethics and morality

All sexual relations outside of marriage are grounds for expulsion if the individual is not deemed repentant; homosexual activity is considered a serious sin, and same-sex marriages are forbidden. Abortion is considered murder. Suicide is considered to be "self-murder" and a sin against God. Modesty in dress and grooming is frequently emphasized. Gambling, drunkenness, illegal drugs, and tobacco use are forbidden. Drinking of alcoholic beverages is permitted in moderation.

The family structure is patriarchal. The husband is considered to have authority on family decisions, but is encouraged to solicit his wife's thoughts and feelings, as well as those of his children. Marriages are required to be monogamous and legally registered. Marrying a non-believer, or endorsing such a union, is strongly discouraged and carries religious sanctions.

Divorce is discouraged, and remarriage is forbidden unless a divorce is obtained on the grounds of adultery, which they refer to as "a scriptural divorce". If a divorce is obtained for any other reason, remarriage is considered adulterous unless the prior spouse has died or is since considered to have committed sexual immorality. Extreme physical abuse, willful non-support of one's family, and what the denomination terms "absolute endangerment of spirituality" are accepted as grounds for legal separation.

Disciplinary action

Formal discipline is administered by congregation elders when a baptized member is accused of committing a serious sin—usually cases of sexual misconduct or charges of apostasy for disputing Jehovah's Witness doctrines. A judicial committee is formed to provide spiritual guidance and determine guilt. This can lead to the subject being disfellowshipped. Disfellowshipping, a form of shunning, is the strongest form of discipline, administered to an offender deemed unrepentant. Contact with disfellowshipped individuals is limited to direct family members living in the same home, and with congregation elders who may invite disfellowshipped persons to apply for reinstatement. Formal business dealings may continue if contractually or financially obliged. 

Witnesses are taught that avoiding social and spiritual interaction with disfellowshipped individuals keeps the congregation free from immoral influence and that "losing precious fellowship with loved ones may help [the shunned individual] to come 'to his senses,' see the seriousness of his wrong, and take steps to return to Jehovah." The practice of shunning may also serve to deter other members from dissident behavior. Members who disassociate (formally resign) are described in Watch Tower Society literature as wicked and are also shunned. 

Expelled individuals may eventually be reinstated to the congregation if deemed repentant by elders in the congregation in which the disfellowshipping was enforced. Reproof is a lesser form of discipline given formally by a judicial committee to a baptized Witness who is considered repentant of serious sin; the reproved person temporarily loses conspicuous privileges of service, but suffers no restriction of social or spiritual fellowship. Marking, a curtailing of social but not spiritual fellowship, is practiced if a baptized member persists in a course of action regarded as a violation of Bible principles but not a serious sin.

Separateness

Jehovah's Witnesses believe that the Bible condemns the mixing of religions, on the basis that there can only be one truth from God, and therefore reject interfaith and ecumenical movements. They believe that only Jehovah's Witnesses represent true Christianity, and that other religions fail to meet all the requirements set by God and will soon be destroyed. Jehovah's Witnesses are taught that it is vital to remain "separate from the world." The Witnesses' literature defines the "world" as "the mass of mankind apart from Jehovah's approved servants" and teach that it is morally contaminated and ruled by Satan. 

Witnesses are taught that association with "worldly" people presents a "danger" to their faith, and are instructed to minimize social contact with non-members to better maintain their own standards of morality. Attending university is discouraged and trade schools are suggested as an alternative. Receiving a post-secondary education is considered "spiritually dangerous". Anthony Morris III, a member of the Governing Body, has been quoted as saying "the most intelligent and eloquent professors will be trying to reshape the thinking of your child, and their influence can be tremendous."

Jehovah's Witnesses believe their allegiance belongs to God's kingdom, which is viewed as an actual government in heaven, with Christ as king. They remain politically neutral, do not seek public office, and are discouraged from voting, though individual members may participate in uncontroversial community improvement issues. Although they do not take part in politics, they respect the authority of the governments under which they live. They do not celebrate religious holidays such as Christmas and Easter, nor do they observe birthdays, national holidays, or other celebrations they consider to honor people other than Jesus. They feel that these and many other customs have pagan origins or reflect a nationalistic or political spirit. Their position is that these traditional holidays reflect Satan's control over the world. Witnesses are told that spontaneous giving at other times can help their children to not feel deprived of birthdays or other celebrations.

They do not work in industries associated with the military, do not serve in the armed services, and refuse national military service, which in some countries may result in their arrest and imprisonment. They do not salute or pledge allegiance to flags or sing national anthems or patriotic songs. Jehovah's Witnesses see themselves as a worldwide brotherhood that transcends national boundaries and ethnic loyalties. Sociologist Ronald Lawson has suggested the group's intellectual and organizational isolation, coupled with the intense indoctrination of adherents, rigid internal discipline and considerable persecution, has contributed to the consistency of its sense of urgency in its apocalyptic message.

Rejection of blood transfusions

Jehovah's Witnesses refuse blood transfusions, which they consider a violation of God's law based on their interpretation of Acts 15:28, 29 and other scriptures. Since 1961, the willing acceptance of a blood transfusion by an unrepentant member has been grounds for expulsion from the group. Members are directed to refuse blood transfusions, even in "a life-or-death situation". Jehovah's Witnesses accept non-blood alternatives and other medical procedures in lieu of blood transfusions, and their literature provides information about non-blood medical procedures.

Jehovah's Witnesses do not accept the transfusion of "whole blood, packed red cells, platelets, white cells or plasma". Autologous blood donation, where an individual's own blood is stored for later use, is also not considered acceptable. Members may accept some blood plasma fractions at their own discretion. The Watch Tower Society provides pre-formatted durable power of attorney documents prohibiting major blood components, in which members can specify which allowable fractions and treatments they will personally accept. Jehovah's Witnesses have established Hospital Liaison Committees as a cooperative arrangement between individual Jehovah's Witnesses and medical professionals and hospitals.

Demographics

Jehovah's Witnesses have an active presence in most countries, but do not form a large part of the population of any country.
For 2022, Jehovah's Witnesses reported approximately 8.5 million publishers—the term they use for members actively involved in preaching—in about 118,000 congregations. For the same year, they reported over 1.5 billion hours spent in preaching activity, and conducted Bible studies with more than 5.7 million individuals (including those conducted by Witness parents with their children). 

In 2022, Jehovah's Witnesses reported a worldwide annual increase of 0.4%. Over 19.7 million people attended the annual memorial of Christ's death. According to the Watch Tower Society, more than 25,600 members have died from COVID-19.

The official published membership statistics, such as those mentioned above, include only those who submit reports for their personal ministry; official statistics do not include inactive and disfellowshipped individuals or others who might attend their meetings. As a result, only about half of those who self-identified as Jehovah's Witnesses in independent demographic studies are considered active by the faith itself. 

The 2008 US Pew Forum on Religion & Public Life survey found a low retention rate among members of the denomination: about 37% of people raised in the group continued to identify themselves as Jehovah's Witnesses. The next lowest retention rates were for Buddhism at 50% and Catholicism at 68%. The study also found that 65% of adult Jehovah's Witnesses in the US are converts.

Sociological analysis

Sociologist James A. Beckford, in his 1975 study of Jehovah's Witnesses, classified the group's organizational structure as Totalizing, characterized by an assertive leadership, specific and narrow objectives, control over competing demands on members' time and energy, and control over the quality of new members. Other characteristics of the classification include likelihood of friction with secular authorities, reluctance to co-operate with other religious organizations, a high rate of membership turnover, a low rate of doctrinal change, and strict uniformity of beliefs among members. 

Beckford identified the group's chief characteristics as historicism (identifying historical events as relating to the outworking of God's purpose), absolutism (conviction that Jehovah's Witness leaders dispense absolute truth), activism (capacity to motivate members to perform missionary tasks), rationalism (conviction that Witness doctrines have a rational basis devoid of mystery), authoritarianism (rigid presentation of regulations without the opportunity for criticism) and world indifference (rejection of certain secular requirements and medical treatments).

Sociologist Bryan R. Wilson, in his consideration of five religious groups including Jehovah's Witnesses, noted that each of the denominations:
 "exists in a state of tension with the wider society;"
 "imposes tests of merit on would-be members;"
 "exercises stern discipline, regulating the declared beliefs and the life habits of members and prescribing and operating sanctions for those who deviate, including the possibility of expulsion;"
 "demands sustained and total commitment from its members, and the subordination, and perhaps even the exclusion of all other interests."

A sociological comparative study by the Pew Research Center found that Jehovah's Witnesses in the United States ranked highest in statistics for getting no further than high school graduation, belief in God, importance of religion in one's life, frequency of religious attendance, frequency of prayers, frequency of Bible reading outside of religious services, belief their prayers are answered, belief that their religion can only be interpreted one way, belief that theirs is the only one true faith leading to eternal life, opposition to abortion, and opposition to homosexuality. In the study, Jehovah's Witnesses ranked lowest in statistics for having an interest in politics. It was also among the most ethnically diverse religious groups in the US.

Opposition
Controversy surrounding various beliefs, doctrines and practices of Jehovah's Witnesses has led to opposition from governments, communities, and religious groups. Religious commentator Ken Jubber wrote that "Viewed globally, this persecution has been so persistent and of such intensity that it would not be inaccurate to regard Jehovah's Witnesses as the most persecuted group of Christians of the twentieth century."

Persecution

Political and religious animosity against Jehovah's Witnesses has at times led to mob action and government oppression in various countries.
Their stance regarding political neutrality and their refusal to serve in the military has led to imprisonment of members who refused conscription during World War II and at other times where national service has been compulsory. Their religious activities are currently banned or restricted in some countries, including China, Russia, Vietnam, and many Muslim-majority countries.

Authors including William Whalen, Shawn Francis Peters and former Witnesses Barbara Grizzuti Harrison, Alan Rogerson and William Schnell have claimed the arrests and mob violence in the United States in the 1930s and 1940s were the consequence of what appeared to be a deliberate course of provocation of authorities and other religious groups by Jehovah's Witnesses. Harrison, Schnell and Whalen have suggested Rutherford invited and cultivated opposition for publicity purposes in a bid to attract dispossessed members of society, and to convince members that persecution from the outside world was evidence of the truth of their struggle to serve God. Watch Tower Society literature of the period directed that Witnesses should "never seek a controversy" nor resist arrest, but also advised members not to co-operate with police officers or courts that ordered them to stop preaching, and to prefer jail rather than pay fines.

Canada 

In 1940, one year following Canada's entry into World War II, the denomination was banned under the War Measures Act. This ban continued until 1943. Hundreds of members were prosecuted for being members of an illegal organization. Jehovah's Witnesses were interned in camps along with political dissidents and people of Chinese and Japanese descent. Jehovah's Witnesses faced discrimination in Quebec until the Quiet Revolution, including bans on distributing literature or holding meetings. Roncarelli v Duplessis was a legal case heard by the Supreme Court of Canada. The court held that in 1946 Maurice Duplessis, both Premier and Attorney General of Quebec,  had overstepped his authority by ordering the manager of the Liquor Commission to revoke the liquor licence of Frank Roncarelli, a Montreal restaurant owner and Jehovah's Witness who was an outspoken critic of the Roman Catholic Church in Quebec. Roncarelli provided bail for Jehovah's Witnesses arrested for distributing pamphlets attacking the Roman Catholic Church. The Supreme Court found Duplessis personally liable for  $33,123.56 in damages plus Roncarelli's court costs.

Germany 

In 1933, there were approximately 20,000 Jehovah's Witnesses in Nazi Germany, of whom about 10,000 were imprisoned. Jehovah's Witnesses suffered religious persecution by the Nazis because they refused military service and allegiance to Hitler's National Socialist Party. Of those, 2,000 were sent to Nazi concentration camps, where they were identified by purple triangles; as many as 1,200 died, including 250 who were executed.

In socialist East Germany, from the 1950s to the 1980s, Jehovah's Witnesses were persecuted extensively by the State Security Service (the Stasi), who frequently used decomposition methods against them. Jehovah's Witnesses were considered to be a threat because their belief system did not conform to socialist standards, and their members sometimes had contact with the West.

Russia 
In April 1951, about 9,300 Jehovah's Witnesses in the Soviet Union were deported to Siberia as part of Operation North.

In April 2017, the Supreme Court of Russia labeled Jehovah's Witnesses an extremist organization, banned its activities in Russia and issued an order to confiscate the organization's assets.

Legal challenges

Several cases involving Jehovah's Witnesses have been heard by Supreme Courts throughout the world. The cases generally relate to their right to practice their religion, displays of patriotism and military service, and blood transfusions.

In the United States, legal challenges by Jehovah's Witnesses prompted a series of state and federal court rulings that reinforced judicial protections for civil liberties. Among the rights strengthened by Witness court victories in the United States are the protection of religious conduct from federal and state interference, the right to abstain from patriotic rituals and military service, the right of patients to refuse medical treatment, and the right to engage in public discourse. Similar cases in their favor have been heard in Canada.

Criticism and controversy

Jehovah's Witnesses have received criticism from mainstream Christianity, members of the medical community, former members and commentators regarding their beliefs and practices. The movement has been accused of doctrinal inconsistency and reversals, failed predictions, mistranslation of the Bible, harsh treatment of former members and autocratic and coercive leadership. Criticism has also focused on their rejection of blood transfusions, particularly in life-threatening medical situations, and failing to report cases of sexual abuse to the authorities.

Free speech and thought
Doctrines of Jehovah's Witnesses are established by the Governing Body. The denomination does not tolerate dissent over doctrines and practices; members who openly disagree with the group's teachings are expelled and shunned. Witness publications strongly discourage followers from questioning doctrine and counsel received from the Governing Body, reasoning that it is to be trusted as part of "God's organization". It also warns members to "avoid independent thinking", claiming such thinking "was introduced by Satan the Devil" and would "cause division". Those who openly disagree with official teachings are condemned as "apostates" who are "mentally diseased".

Former members Heather and Gary Botting compare the cultural paradigms of the denomination to George Orwell's Nineteen Eighty-Four, and Alan Rogerson describes the group's leadership as totalitarian. Other critics say that by disparaging individual decision-making, the group's leaders cultivate a system of unquestioning obedience in which Witnesses abrogate all responsibility and rights over their personal lives. Critics also accuse the group's leaders of exercising "intellectual dominance" over Witnesses, controlling information and creating "mental isolation", which former Governing Body member Raymond Franz argued were all elements of mind control.

Jehovah's Witness publications state that consensus of faith aids unity, and deny that unity restricts individuality or imagination. Historian James Irvin Lichti has rejected the description of the denomination as "totalitarian". Sociologist Rodney Stark states that Jehovah's Witness leaders are "not always very democratic" and that members "are expected to conform to rather strict standards," but adds that "enforcement tends to be very informal, sustained by the close bonds of friendship within the group", and that Jehovah's Witnesses see themselves as "part of the power structure rather than subject to it." Sociologist Andrew Holden states that most members who join millenarian movements such as Jehovah's Witnesses have made an informed choice. He also states that defectors "are seldom allowed a dignified exit", and describes the administration as autocratic.

New World Translation

Various Bible scholars, including Bruce M. Metzger and MacLean Gilmour, have said that while scholarship is evident in New World Translation, its rendering of certain texts is inaccurate and biased in favor of Witness practices and doctrines. Critics of the group such as Edmund C. Gruss, and Christian writers such as Ray C. Stedman, Walter Martin, Norman Klann, and Anthony Hoekema state that the New World Translation exhibits scholastic dishonesty. Most criticism of the New World Translation relates to its rendering of the New Testament, particularly regarding the introduction of the name Jehovah and in passages related to the Trinity doctrine.

Unfulfilled predictions

Watch Tower Society publications have claimed that God has used Jehovah's Witnesses (and formerly, the International Bible Students) to declare his will and has provided advance knowledge about Armageddon and the establishment of God's kingdom. Some publications also claimed that God has used Jehovah's Witnesses and the International Bible Students as a modern-day prophet. George D. Chryssides stated, "while prediction may be part of a biblical prophet's role, the root meaning of prophecy is that of proclaiming God's word." He went on to say that, "Jehovah's Witnesses ... are the recipients of prophecy, who regard themselves as invested with the interpretation of biblical writings." With these interpretations, Jehovah's Witnesses' publications have made various predictions about world events they believe were prophesied in the Bible. Failed predictions have led to the alteration or abandonment of some doctrines. Some failed predictions had been presented as "beyond doubt" or "approved by God".

The Watch Tower Society rejects accusations that it is a false prophet, stating that its interpretations are not inspired or infallible, and that it has not claimed its predictions were "the words of Jehovah." Chryssides has suggested that with the exception of statements about 1914, 1925 and 1975, the changing views and dates of the Jehovah's Witnesses are largely attributable to changed understandings of biblical chronology rather than to failed predictions. Chryssides further states, "it is therefore simplistic and naïve to view the Witnesses as a group that continues to set a single end-date that fails and then devise a new one, as many counter-cultists do." Sociologist Andrew Holden wrote that since the foundation of the movement around 140 years ago, "Witnesses have maintained that we are living on the precipice of the end of time."

Handling of sexual abuse cases

Jehovah's Witnesses have been accused of having policies and culture that help to conceal cases of sexual abuse within the organization. The group has been criticized for its "two witness rule" for church discipline, based on its application of scriptures in Deuteronomy 19:15 and Matthew 18:15–17, which requires sexual abuse to be substantiated by secondary evidence if the accused person denies any wrongdoing. In cases where corroboration is lacking, the Watch Tower Society's instruction is that "the elders will leave the matter in Jehovah's hands". 

A former member of the headquarters staff, Barbara Anderson, says the policy effectively requires that there be another witness to an act of molestation, "which is an impossibility". Anderson says the policies "protect pedophiles rather than protect the children." Jehovah's Witnesses maintain that they have a strong policy to protect children, adding that the best way to protect children is by educating parents; they also state that they do not sponsor activities that separate children from parents.

The group's failure to report abuse allegations to authorities has also been criticized. The Watch Tower Society's policy is that elders inform authorities when required by law to do so, but otherwise leave that action up to the victim and his or her family. William Bowen, a former Jehovah's Witness elder who established the Silentlambs organization to assist sex abuse victims within the denomination, has claimed Witness leaders discourage followers from reporting incidents of sexual misconduct to authorities, and other critics claim the organization is reluctant to alert authorities in order to protect its "crime-free" reputation.

In court cases in the United Kingdom and the United States, the Watch Tower Society has been found negligent in its failure to protect children from known sex offenders within the congregation. The Society has settled other child abuse lawsuits out of court, reportedly paying as much as $780,000 to one plaintiff without admitting wrongdoing. In 2017, the Charity Commission for England and Wales began an inquiry into Jehovah's Witnesses' handling of allegations of child sexual abuse in the United Kingdom.

The Australian Royal Commission into Institutional Responses to Child Sexual Abuse found that "there was no evidence before the Royal Commission of the Jehovah’s Witness organisation having or not having reported to police any of the 1,006 alleged
perpetrators of child sexual abuse identified by the organisation since 1950." The Royal Commission also found that the Watch Tower Society legal department routinely provided incorrect information to elders based on an incorrect understanding of what constitutes a legal obligation to report crimes in Australia. In 2021, Jehovah's Witnesses in Australia agreed to join the nation's redress scheme for sexual assault survivors to maintain its charity status there.

Explanatory notes

References

Sources

Further reading

 
 
 
 
 
 
 A detailed examination of the development of Jehovah's Witnesses' eschatology.
  
 
 
 An academic study on the sociological aspects of Jehovah's Witnesses phenomenon.
 
 Documents the Witnesses' fight for civil rights in Canada and the US amid political persecution during World War II.
 
 
 Penton, professor emeritus of history at University of Lethbridge and a former member of the group, examines the history of Jehovah's Witnesses, and their doctrines.
 
 Detailed history of the Watch Tower movement, particularly its early years, a summary of Witness doctrines and the organizational and personal framework in which Witnesses conduct their lives
 
 Detailed history of the Watch Tower movement's earliest years written to an academic standard. Based on fresh research into original documents of the era. This is volume one of a planned two volume work.
 Watch Tower Bible and Tract Society of Pennsylvania. Jehovah's Witnesses—Proclaimers of God's Kingdom (1993)
 Official history of Jehovah's Witnesses.
 Watch Tower Bible and Tract Society of Pennsylvania. Faith in Action (two-DVD series; 2010–2011)
 Official history of Jehovah's Witnesses.

External links

 
 BBC Religions: Jehovah's Witnesses
 Jehovah's Witnesses new method - BBC News Magazine article

 
1870 establishments in Pennsylvania
Apocalyptic groups
Bible Student movement
Christian groups with annihilationist beliefs
Christian new religious movements
Nontrinitarian denominations
Premillennialism
Religious belief systems founded in the United States
Religious identity
Religious organizations established in 1870
Restorationism (Christianity)